Naratip Phayuep-Plurk (born June 29, 1990) is a Thai professional footballer who plays as a defender

References

External links
  at Soccerway

1989 births
Living people
Naratip Phayuep-Plurk
Association football defenders
Samutsongkhram F.C. players
Naratip Phayuep-Plurk
Naratip Phayuep-Plurk
Naratip Phayuep-Plurk